The Parliament of the Brussels-Capital Region (French: Parlement de la Région de Bruxelles-Capitale, Dutch: Parlement van het Brussels Hoofdstedelijk Gewest), is the governing body of the Brussels-Capital Region, one of the three regions of Belgium. It is also known as the Brussels Regional Parliament (French: Parlement Bruxellois, Dutch: Brussels Hoofdstedelijk Parlement).

Elections
Elections of 75 Brussels regional deputies, 89 since 2004, take place every five years. Here is the list of past regional elections:
 June 18, 1989 (first elections)
 May 21, 1995, coincided with the federal legislative elections;
 June 13, 1999, coincided with the European Parliament elections;
 June 13, 2004, coincided with the European Parliament elections;
 June 7, 2009, coincided with the European Parliament elections;
 May 25, 2014 coincided with the European Parliament elections;
 May 26, 2019, coincided with the European Parliament elections.

Current composition
The composition of the Brussels Parliament is as follows:

Previous compositions 
2004–2009

2009–2014

2014–2019

2019–present

Functions 
The Brussels Parliament role mainly consists in controlling the government of the Brussels-Capital Region, approving the budget and creating and passing legislation in regional matters, known as ordinances, which are legally binding. One of its first tasks after the Parliament is renewed is appointing five ministers and three regional secretaries of state, who together form the cabinet of the Brussels-Capital Region.

The Brussels Parliament can also force the cabinet as a whole or one or more of its members to resign by passing a motion of no confidence. However, because the Parliament cannot be dissolved prior to the end of its five-year term, such a motion is only admissible if it is a constructive motion, in other words, the Parliament must decide upon a successor to the cabinet or to one or more of its members.

The 89 members of the Brussels Parliament are divided into two language groups: 72 belong to the French-speaking group and 17 members belong to the Dutch-speaking group. The members of the French-speaking group also make up the Parlement francophone bruxellois (in English: Francophone Brussels Parliament), which was formerly known as the Assembly of the French Community Commission, while the members of the Dutch-speaking group make up the Council of the Flemish Community Commission. The Parlement francophone bruxellois and the Council of the Flemish Community Commission together form the United Assembly of the Common Community Commission. The Community Commissions are to a certain extent responsible for Community competencies within the Brussels-Capital Region.

19 of the 72 French-speaking members of the Brussels Parliament are also members of the Parliament of the French Community of Belgium, and until 2004 this was also the case for six Dutch-speaking members, who were at the same time members of the Flemish Parliament. Nowadays, people voting for a Flemish party have to vote separately for 6 directly-elected members of the Flemish Parliament.

Due to the multiple capacities of single members, there are members of the Brussels Parliament who are simultaneously members of the Parliament of the French Community of Belgium and of the Senate as "community senators" for the French Community. At the moment, this is the case for François Roelants du Vivier (MR),  (PS) and Sfia Bouarfa (PS). However, there are certain restrictions in place in order to prevent one person from combining too many mandates. For instance, it is not possible to be a member of the Chamber of Representatives and of one of the Regional Parliaments at the same time.

See also 
 Belgian Federal Parliament (federal assembly - upper and lower houses)
 Flemish Parliament (regional and community assembly)
 Walloon Parliament (regional assembly)
 Parliament of the French Speaking Community (community assembly)
 Parliament of the German Speaking Community (community assembly)
 French Community Commission (COCOF)
 Flemish Community Commission (VGC)

References

Notes

External links 
Brussels-Capital Region. Centre d'Informatique pour la Région Bruxelloise (Brussels Regional Informatics Center).
Brussels Parliament official webpage

 
1989 establishments in Belgium
Government of Brussels